= Club Island =

Club Island may refer to:

- Club Island (Georgian Bay) in Georgian Bay
- Club Island (Saint Lawrence River) in the Saint Lawrence River
